Czech Lion Award for Best Screenplay is award given to the Czech film with best Screenplay.

Winners

External links

Screenwriting awards for film
Czech Lion Awards
Awards established in 1993